Aisseta Diawara (born 29 June 1989 in Paris) is a French athlete, who specializes in the 100m hurdles.

Biography  
She won the  100 hurdles during the 2010 French Athletic Championships, in a time of 13.21s.

Her personal best, set in 2012 at Angers, is 12.88s.

Prize list  
 French Championships in Athletics   :  
 winner 100 hurdles in 2010  ;  2nd in 2012 ; 3rd in 2009 and 2014   
 French Indoor Championships in Athletics:  
 60m hurdles   :  2nd in 2014

Records

Notes and references

External links  
 

1989 births
Living people
French female hurdlers
Athletes from Paris
21st-century French women